Armon Bassett (born December 28, 1986) is a former American professional basketball player. Bassett played collegiately at Indiana University prior to transferring to Ohio University, where he led the team to the NCAA tournament.

He was drafted in the 2010 NBA Development League Draft by the Maine Red Claws but cut prior to the season. He played one season professionally with Ironi Ramat Gan of Israel.

Personal
A native of Terre Haute, Indiana, Bassett attended Terre Haute South Vigo High School before attending Hargrave Military Academy for a prep year.

MAC
Bassett led 9th seeded Ohio to win the 2010 MAC men's basketball tournament, of which he was named MVP.

References

1986 births
Living people
American expatriate basketball people in Israel
American men's basketball players
Basketball players from Indiana
Indiana Hoosiers men's basketball players
Ironi Ramat Gan players
Ohio Bobcats men's basketball players
Point guards
Sportspeople from Terre Haute, Indiana
Hargrave Military Academy alumni